The 2006–07 Moroccan Throne Cup was the 51st edition of the Moroccan cup competition, and was won by FAR de Rabat, who beat Rachad Bernoussi in the final.

5th Round

Last 32

Last 16

Quarter-finals

Semi-finals

Final

References

External links 

 Fédération Royale Marocaine de Football

2006 in association football
2006
2007 in association football
2006–07 in Moroccan football